Luz Milagrosa Obono Obiang Mangue (born 7 April 1996) is an Equatorial Guinean footballer who plays as a forward for Spanish club CD Valdefierro and the Equatorial Guinea women's national team.

Club career
Obono started with Intercontinental FC in the Equatoguinean women's football league. She moved to Leones Vegetarianos FC in 2017. She joined Spanish team El Ejido in the winter of 2019.

International career
Obono made her international debut for Equatorial Guinea on 26 November 2017, coming on as a second-half substitute in a 4–0 home friendly win against Comoros. She also played in at least one of the two 2018 Africa Women Cup of Nations qualification matches against Kenya and the three matches of the team at the final tournament.

References

1996 births
Living people
People from Ebibeyin
Equatoguinean women's footballers
Women's association football forwards
CD El Ejido (women) players
Atlético Saguntino (women) players
Equatorial Guinea women's international footballers
Equatoguinean expatriate women's footballers
Equatoguinean expatriate sportspeople in Spain
Expatriate women's footballers in Spain